Chánguena is a district of the Buenos Aires canton, in the Puntarenas province of Costa Rica.

History 
Chánguena was created on 28 January 1988 by Acuerdo 28.

Geography 
Chánguena has an area of  km² and an elevation of  metres.

Demographics 

For the 2011 census, Chánguena had a population of  inhabitants.

References 

Districts of Puntarenas Province
Populated places in Puntarenas Province